Prophecy is a thoroughbred racehorse who won the Cheveley Park Stakes in 1993.

1991 racehorse births
Racehorses bred in Ireland
Racehorses trained in the United Kingdom
Thoroughbred family 5-j